The California Limited was one of the named passenger trains of the Atchison, Topeka and Santa Fe Railway. It carried train Nos. 3 & 4 and ran between Chicago, Illinois and Los Angeles, California.

The line was conceived by company president Allen Manvel as a means to "signify completion of the basic Santa Fe system."  Manvel felt he could attract business and enhance the prestige of the railroad with daily first-class service from Chicago to the West Coast.  The California Limited, billed as the "Finest Train West of Chicago," made its first run on November 27, 1892.  

The California Limited was the first Santa Fe train with Fred Harvey Company meal service.  The later trains also offered air conditioning, a barber, beautician, steam-operated clothing press, even a shower-bath.  The Limited was the first Santa Fe train with illuminated drumhead on its observation cars, with the train's name over the company logo.

The California Limited was withdrawn on June 15, 1954, giving it the longest tenure of any train on the Chicago-Los Angeles run of the Santa Fe.

History

The Santa Fe introduced the California Limited on November 27, 1892. The journey took 83 hours and 50 minutes and required fifteen locomotive changes. During the summer, multiple sections were necessary to accommodate demand; reportedly 23 sections once operated from Chicago on one day. The train carried just Pullman sleeping cars (no coaches) until 1938.

The Santa Fe re-equipped the California Limited in 1910 with a club-lounge, a twin-unit dining car, and new 7-2 (7 compartments, 2 drawing rooms) sleeping cars from Pullman. The weekly extra-fare Santa Fe de Luxe in 1911 overshadowed the California Limited, but it remained a popular train. The introduction of the Chief in 1926 eclipsed the California Limited, although the train ran for another three decades.

In October 1953, it was scheduled to leave Los Angeles at 1815 with coaches and sleepers-- no diner and no lounge. A breakfast stop was scheduled at Seligman, a lunch stop at Winslow, and a dinner stop at Albuquerque. Next morning, at La Junta, it would add a diner for the rest of the run to Chicago (scheduled arrival 0830). It ran via Pasadena, Great Bend and Topeka.

Timeline
 October 1892:  The Pullman Company delivers five six-car trainsets for the California Limited.
 November 27, 1892:  Regular service begins.
 1893:  The train receives four new dining cars designed by Barney & Smith.
 May 4, 1896:  Service suspended.
 November 1896:  Regular service resumes.
 November 1898: Westward schedule drops to 67 hr 50 min, about as good as it ever did until it dropped to 63 hours in June 1929.
 1899:  The Limited is reduced to four trains per week.
 1902:  The train resumes daily service on a 68-hour schedule.
 July 1923: Walt Disney leaves Kansas City for Los Angeles aboard the California Limited, arriving at La Grande Station. His brother, Roy O. Disney, was then living at a veteran's hospital in Sawtell, Calif., west of Los Angeles.
 April 1, 1938:  The Limited is suspended.
 May 22, 1938:  Regular service resumes.
 September 4, 1945:  The second section of Train No. 4 enters a siding near milepost 126 in the City of Santa Anita, California at excessive speed and derails.  Some 200 people are injured, five fatally.  One cleanup worker dies the following day in a freak accident.
 June 15, 1954:  The California Limited is withdrawn.

Equipment

A variety of steam and diesel locomotives pulled the California Limited.

In 1892, the California Limited consisted of heavyweight cars built by Pullman-Standard. Each train contained:

 a compartment and drawing-room Sleeping car
 a Dining car that served "the best Fred Harvey meals on rails"
 a Club car / Parlor car
 a full-compartment Sleeping car
 a compartment drawing-room Sleeping car
 a combination 10-compartment Sleeping car / open-end Observation car

See also
 Passenger train service on the Atchison, Topeka and Santa Fe Railway

References

 
 
 Patterson, Clyde Q. (2005). "The Wreck of Second No. 4: The California Limited Tragedy at Santa Anita." The Warbonnet 11 (2) 6-13.

External links

California State Railway Museum
Santa Fe Railway Historical & Modeling Society
Atchison, Topeka and Santa Fe Railway Verde Valley —  photos and short history of a California Limited Sleeping Car built in 1942.
 Scanned copy of the 1900-1901 brochure for the California Limited.

Passenger trains of the Atchison, Topeka and Santa Fe Railway
Named passenger trains of the United States
Railway services introduced in 1892
Night trains of the United States
Railway services discontinued in 1954